Feroce (Italian for 'ferocious') or Féroce (French for 'ferocious') may refer to:

 Delfino Feroce, a British sports car
 Fairey Féroce, a British fighter aircraft of the 1930s
 Féroce, an avocado dish with chillis etc.
 Giovanni Feroce, American businessman and politician